Xoltəzəkənd (also, Kholtazakend) is a village in the Neftchala Rayon of Azerbaijan.  The village forms part of the municipality of Xol Qarabucaq.

References 

Populated places in Neftchala District